Charles E. Meier is a member of the Illinois House of Representatives as a representative for the 108th district. This district includes all of Clinton County as well as parts of Madison, St. Clair, and Washington counties in Southern Illinois.

As of July 3, 2022, Representative Meier is a member of the following Illinois House committees:

 Agriculture & Conservation Committee (HAGC)
 Appropriations - Human Services Committee (HAPH)
 Energy & Environment Committee (HENG)
 Human Services Committee (HHSV)
 International Trade & Commerce Committee (HITC)
 Mental Health & Addiction Committee (HMEH)
 Special Issues (HS) Subcommittee (HHSV-SPIS)

References

External links
101st ILGA profile

Living people
Republican Party members of the Illinois House of Representatives
People from Washington County, Illinois
Year of birth missing (living people)
21st-century American politicians